Juan José Santa Cruz López (born 26 April 1959) is a Chilean lawyer, businessman and politician. 

In 2010, he was a founding member of El Dínamo newspaper alongside Sebastián Sichel (then Sebastián Iglesias).

Biography
He was born within the marriage between Andrés Santa Cruz Serrano and Mercedes López Latorre, granddaughter of Admiral Juan José Latorre, Chilean hero during the War of the Pacific (1879–1884). Despite his family was of christian-democratic tendencies, his brother Andrés was a collaborator of Augusto Pinochet dictatorship (1973–1990). Nevertheless, Juan José opposed the military regime voting against the 1980 Constitution of Chile.

On 5 April 2018, he refused being President of Televisión Nacional de Chile (TVN) board. Then, on 14 June, he broke up with Citizens —his party— after differences with Andrés Velasco.

Since December 2020, it made massively known his work by Sebastián Sichel campaign.

References

External links
 Juan José Santa Cruz on Twitter

1959 births
Living people
People from Santiago
Pontifical Catholic University of Chile alumni
20th-century Chilean lawyers
Christian Democratic Party (Chile) politicians
Citizens (Chilean political party) politicians
21st-century Chilean lawyers